RahXephon is an anime television series produced by Bones and directed by Yutaka Izubuchi. It was broadcast in Japan on Fuji Television from January 21, 2002 to September 11, 2002, which coincidentally was one year after the September 11 attacks. In keeping with the musical theme of the series, episodes are called "movements". and each volume of DVD is called an "orchestration". Each episode has a title screen that provides an English title for that episode, which generally does not correspond to a translation from the Japanese title. In addition to the 26 regular episodes, one recap episode was aired, and one episode was released as an (OVA).

The original air dates are schedule dates; these are calendar dates until the April series break, when Fuji Television moved RahXephon from Monday afternoons into a Tuesday late night anime block. Episodes 10 through 26 started at 25:55, which is at 1:55 a.m. Wednesday. This means that the calendar dates of the first and last episode airings are 21 January 2002 and 11 September 2002, respectively. Stations in the Fuji Network System affiliate Tōkai Television Broadcasting network started airing the series in the late night but moved it to late afternoons after the same series break. RahXephon thus remained both a late night and late afternoon anime series throughout its original run.

Episode list

OVA

Anime distribution
Television broadcast and Video on demand
Among the television networks and video on demand (VOD) services and that have broadcast or streamed RahXephon are:

Home Media release
In Japan, the Media Factory DVD release started while the series was still airing. , containing a "making-of" documentary and trailers, was released as a prelude on 29 March 2002. Its content was used as bonus material in the international releases. The series itself was released on nine volumes of DVD, the first one on 31 May 2002.

The series and the movie were licensed internationally. ADV Films released the show as seven DVD volumes in the United States and United Kingdom. In addition to the Japanese bonus materials, ADV included interviews with some of their voice actors. Other distributors released the show in other regions and languages.

ADV Films announced new High-Definition DVDs for release in 2005; each volume was planned have one disc of HD video and another with both DTS 5.1 and Dolby 5.1 audio for the standard definition video. However, these were delayed and ultimately failed to be released. Media Factory released a DVD box in spring 2007 which included a HD DVD edition of the movie, new art by Akihiro Yamada, and a re-release of the OVA episode. On February 23, 2011, Media Factory released a Blu-ray box set of the series that included both Japanese and English audio as well as English subtitles.

References

External links

Official
  Official website
  Official video game website
Unofficial
 

RahXephon
Episodes